WCCK (95.7 FM, "K95.7") is a classic country–formatted radio station licensed to Calvert City, Kentucky, United States.  The station is owned by Jim Freeland along with oldies stations Benton–licensed WCBL (1290 AM) and Grand Rivers–licensed WCBL-FM (99.1 FM).

Programming
WCCK broadcasts a classic country music format to the Paducah, Kentucky, area.  In addition to its usual music programming, WCCK was previously an affiliate of the Tennessee Titans football radio network, a distinction now held by sister station WCBL. and the University of Louisville Cardinals athletics network.

History
Stice Communications received the original construction permit for a new FM radio station from the Federal Communications Commission on March 5, 1993.  The new station was assigned the call letters WCCK by the FCC on May 14, 1993.  WCCK received its license to cover from the FCC on January 10, 1994.

In May 2000, Stice Communications, Inc., reached an agreement to sell this station to Freeland Broadcasting.  The deal was approved by the FCC on July 11, 2000, and the transaction was consummated on July 31, 2000.

The WCCK call letters were originally assigned to 103.7 (top 40 "K-104") In Erie, PA, in the late 1960s, until the early 1990s when the call letters were changed to WMXE, now WRTS (STAR-104) which plays top 40 format.

References

External links
WCCK 95.7 Facebook

CCK
Classic country radio stations in the United States
Marshall County, Kentucky